is a 1987 Japanese film directed by Mamoru Oshii, co-written with Kazunori Ito, and starring Shigeru Chiba and Mako Hyodo.

This is the first film of the Kerberos saga.

Plot

It is the end of the 20th century. The Metropolitan Police have begun to lose control of Tokyo; crime is rampant and people are no longer safe. Their solution: the establishment of the Anti Vicious Crime Heavily Armored Mobile Special Investigations Unit. Created by men and women of high intellect and physical strength who had a particularly strong, even fanatical sense of justice, they were nicknamed "Kerberos", and armed with special body armor called "reinforcement gear" and heavy weaponry.

What started as a noble and courageous effort to stop the onslaught of crime soon spiraled out of control. Their overzealous actions and fanatical hatred of evil soon led to less-than police-like behavior. Public criticism grew as their investigative tactics became more aggressive, cruel, and corrupt. The turning point occurred when a Kerberos member, during a routine investigation, beat a misdemeanor offender to death.

This was the catalyst and justification to shut the group down forever and dissolve it completely. However, there were those in the Kerberos group who refused to disarm. Three of the elite rebelled against the system, and fought their way through the city. Two were wounded, and unable to escape capture. Only one—senior detective, Koichi Todome, managed to escape, and he promised the others that he would return for them.

Several years later, Koichi, a fugitive from the government, returns home for reasons that seem unclear. The city has decayed at an exponential rate and is completely unlike the place he left behind. Everything is surreal and strange, blurred and nondescript. He wanders, trying to find some semblance of his past and to find the comrades he'd left behind. But, the city itself seems to resist him, and there are those who realize the threat that Koichi poses, and his return is more dangerous than anyone realizes.

In the end, it is revealed that most of Koichi's exploits in Japan are in fact a dying dream, as he is attacked and killed shortly after returning to Japan.

Cast
Shigeru Chiba - Kōichi Todome 
Machiko Washio - Washio Midori
Hideyuki Tanaka - Sōichirō Toribe
Tessho Genda - Bunmei Muroto
Mako Hyodo - Young Lady
Hideyo Amamoto - Moongaze Ginji 
offscreen - Hamburger Tetsu
offscreen - Beefbowl Ushigoro
offscreen - Medium Hot Sabu
offscreen - Baked Bean Pastry Amataro
offscreen - Crepe Mami
Ichiro Nagai - Middle-aged man in billiards, taxi driver's voice 
Yasuo Otsuka - Taxi driver 
Oikawa Hiroe - Oriental Hotel receptionist 
Fuyuki Shinada - Soba Udon cook 
Fumi Hirano - Airport announcer 
Kintaroh Sakata - Umibōzu

Production
Several of the cast members are voice actors and appeared in Urusei Yatsura, which Oshii worked on as chief director and head writer.

The Red Spectacles is probably Oshii's most literate feature work. Not only, dialogue and narrative parts are prominent over drama but the film contains a variety of philosophical concepts such as Free will and Determinism, mentioned through fables, like "The Magnet and the Iron Sands" and "The Ogre Saved by the Fisherman", or through classic poet-authors quotes, Shakespeare and Pushkin. The characters refers to European medieval tales and Greek mythology, such as oral versions of Little Red Riding Hood and the three-headed watchdog of Hell Cerberus.

Releases
On February 25, 2003, the DVD edition was made available in Japan as part of the Mamoru Oshii Cinema Trilogy anthology box set, which contained four DVDs and one soundtrack CD. On November 4 of the same year, a subtitled version of Akai megane was released in North America as both a single DVD and also as part of a US release of the box set. The US version of the trilogy box set has different box artwork and lacks the "Revisited Scene & Production" DVD of the Japanese version.

The American The Red Spectacles DVD edition was reprinted in 2004, and since then is only available in the box set which was printed three times as of 2006 and remains the only edition released outside Japan.

Related works
The Red Spectacles is the first film of the Kerberos saga. Oshii would write a lengthy comic series expanding on the universe.

While Waiting for the Red Spectacles (1987) is a radio drama prequel written by Kazunori Itō with an original soundtrack composed by Kenji Kawai.

The film would be followed by two prequels: StrayDog: Kerberos Panzer Cops (1991) and Jin-Roh: The Wolf Brigade (1999).

References

External links
 Kerberos saga official website (Japanese)
 

1987 films
1980s science fiction thriller films
Japanese black-and-white films
Films directed by Mamoru Oshii
Films set in 1995
1980s Japanese-language films
Japanese independent films
Kerberos saga
Japanese political thriller films
Tokyo Metropolitan Police Department in fiction
Films scored by Kenji Kawai
1987 independent films
1980s political thriller films
Japanese science fiction thriller films
1980s Japanese films